Khamir Rural District is a rural district (dehestan) in the Central District of Khamir County, Hormozgan Province, Iran. At the 2006 census, its population was 11,648, in 2,411 families. The rural district has 12 villages.

References 

Rural Districts of Hormozgan Province
Khamir County